Sterling Price Holloway Jr. (January 14, 1905 – November 22, 1992) was an American actor and voice actor who appeared in over 100 films and 40 television shows. He did voice acting for The Walt Disney Company, playing Mr. Stork in Dumbo, Adult Flower in Bambi, the Cheshire Cat in Alice in Wonderland, Kaa in The Jungle Book, Roquefort the Mouse in The Aristocats, and the title character in Winnie the Pooh, among many others.

Early life
Born in Cedartown, Georgia, Holloway was named after his father, Sterling Price Holloway (1864–1930), who, in turn, was named after a prominent Confederate general, Sterling "Pap" Price. His mother was Rebecca DeHaven Boothby (1879–1963). He had a younger brother named Boothby (1909–1978). The family owned a grocery store in Cedartown, where his father served as mayor in 1912. After graduating from Georgia Military Academy in 1920 at the age of fifteen, he left Georgia for New York City, where he attended the American Academy of Dramatic Arts. While there, he befriended actor Spencer Tracy, whom he considered one of his favorite working colleagues.

Career

Films and shorts

In his late teens, Holloway toured with the stock company of The Shepherd of the Hills, performing in one-nighters across much of the American West before returning to New York where he accepted small walk-on parts from the Theatre Guild, and appeared in the Rodgers and Hart revue The Garrick Gaieties in the mid-1920s. A talented singer, he introduced "Manhattan" in 1925, and the following year sang "Mountain Greenery".

He moved to Hollywood in 1926 to begin a film career that lasted almost 50 years. His bushy red hair and foggy distinctive voice meant that he almost always appeared in comedies. His first film was The Battling Kangaroo (1926), a silent picture. Over the following decades, Holloway would appear with Fred MacMurray, Barbara Stanwyck, Lon Chaney Jr., Clark Gable, Joan Crawford, Bing Crosby, and John Carradine. In 1942, during World War II, Holloway enlisted in the United States Army at the age of 37 and was assigned to the Special Services. He helped develop a show called "Hey Rookie", which ran for nine months and raised $350,000 for the Army Relief Fund. In 1945, Holloway played the role of a medic assigned to an infantry platoon in the critically acclaimed film A Walk in the Sun. Between 1946 and 1947, he played the comic sidekick in five Gene Autry Westerns.

With Walt Disney
Walt Disney originally considered Holloway for the voice of Sleepy in Snow White and the Seven Dwarfs (1937), but chose Pinto Colvig instead. Holloway's voice work in animated films began with Dumbo (1941), as the voice of Mr. Stork. Holloway was the voice of the adult Flower in Bambi (1942), the narrator of the Antarctic penguin sequence in The Three Caballeros (1944) and the narrator in the Peter and the Wolf sequence of Make Mine Music (1946). He was the voice of the Cheshire Cat in Alice in Wonderland (1951); the narrator in The Little House (1952), Susie the Little Blue Coupe (1952), Lambert the Sheepish Lion (1952), and Goliath II (1960); Kaa the snake in The Jungle Book (1967); and Roquefort the mouse in The Aristocats (1970). He is perhaps best remembered as the voice of Winnie the Pooh in Disney's Winnie the Pooh featurettes through 1977. He was honored as a Disney Legend in 1991, the first person to receive the award in the voice category. His final role was Hobe Carpenter, a friendly moonshiner who helps Harley Thomas (David Carradine) in Thunder and Lightning (1977). A majority of his roles were inherited by voice actor Jim Cummings following his death.

Radio and recordings
Holloway acted on many radio programs, including The Railroad Hour, The United States Steel Hour, Suspense, Lux Radio Theater, and The Shadow. In the late 1940s, he could be heard in various roles on NBC's "Fibber McGee and Molly". His voice retained a touch of its Southern drawl and was instantly recognizable. Holloway was chosen to narrate many children's records, including Uncle Remus Stories (Decca), Mother Goose Nursery Rhymes (Disneyland Records), Walt Disney Presents Rudyard Kipling's Just So Stories (Disneyland Records) and Peter And The Wolf (RCA Victor).

Television

Holloway easily made the transition from radio to television. He appeared on the Adventures of Superman as "Uncle Oscar", an eccentric inventor, and played a recurring role on The Life of Riley. He guest-starred on Fred Waring's CBS television program in the 1950s and appeared on Circus Boy as a hot air balloonist. Some other series on which he performed include Five Fingers (episode "The Temple of the Swinging Doll"), The Untouchables, The Real McCoys ("The Jinx"), Hazel, Pete and Gladys, The Twilight Zone ("What's in the Box"), The Brothers Brannagan, Gilligan's Island, The Andy Griffith Show, The Donald O'Connor Show, Peter Gunn, F Troop, and Moonlighting. During the 1970s, Holloway did commercial voice-overs for Purina Puppy Chow dog food and sang their familiar jingle, "Puppy Chow/For a full year/Till he's full-grown!" He also provided the voice for Woodsy Owl in several 1970s and 1980s United States Forest Service commercials. He auditioned for the well-known comic book character Garfield in 1982, but lost to Lorenzo Music. He provided voice-over work for the 1984 commercial of Libby's baked beans.

Personal life and death
Holloway was a lifelong Democrat who supported the campaign of Adlai Stevenson during the 1956 United States presidential election. Holloway adhered to Methodism. Throughout his life, Holloway remained a bachelor. He once said this was because he felt lacking in nothing and did not wish to disturb his pattern of life. He adopted a son, Richard Holloway.

Fellow Winnie the Pooh cast member Hal Smith (who originated the character Owl) had taken over the role of Winnie the Pooh for the 1981 short Winnie the Pooh Discovers the Seasons. Holloway was given the chance to return to the role for The New Adventures of Winnie the Pooh but, at 83 years old, could no longer perform the voice as he had in the past; Jim Cummings took over the role as well as most of Holloway's other voice roles, including Kaa in Jungle Cubs and The Jungle Book 2. Holloway died of a cardiac arrest at the Good Samaritan Hospital in the morning on November 22, 1992, at the age of 87.

Filmography

Feature films
 
Casey at the Bat (1927) as Elmer Putnam
American Madness (1932) as Oscar (uncredited)
Blonde Venus (1932) as Joe, Hiker (uncredited)
Faithless (1932) as Photographer (uncredited)
Rockabye (1932) as Speakeasy Pianist (uncredited)
Lawyer Man (1932) as Olga's Dining Friend (uncredited)
Hard to Handle (1933) as Andy Heaney (uncredited)
Blondie Johnson (1933) as Red Charley
Fast Workers (1933) as Pinky Magoo
Hell Below (1933) as Seaman Jenks
Elmer, the Great (1933) as Nick Kane 
Picture Snatcher (1933) as Journalism Student (uncredited)
Adorable (1933) as Emile, Karl's Valet (uncredited)
International House (1933) as Sailor
Gold Diggers of 1933 (1933) as Second Hat Delivery Boy (uncredited)
Professional Sweetheart (1933) as Stu
When Ladies Meet (1933) as Jerome – the Caddy (uncredited)
Wild Boys of the Road (1933) as Ollie, another hobo
Dancing Lady (1933) as Pinky – the Show's Author
Advice to the Lovelorn (1933) as Benny
Alice in Wonderland (1933) as Frog
Going Hollywood (1933) as Radio Remote Technician (uncredited)
The Cat and the Fiddle (1934) as Flower Messenger (uncredited)
Strictly Dynamite (1934) as Elmer Fleming
Back Page (1934) as Bill Giddings
Operator 13 (1934) as Wounded Union Soldier (uncredited)
Murder in the Private Car (1934) as Office Boy (uncredited)
Tomorrow's Children (1934) as Dr. Dorsey
Down to Their Last Yacht (1934) as Freddy Finn
Gift of Gab (1934) as Sound Effects Man
The Merry Widow (1934) as Mischka the orderly
Girl o' My Dreams (1934) as Spec Early
A Wicked Woman (1934) as Peter
Lottery Lover (1935) as Cadet Harold Stump
 Life Begins at 40 (1935) as Chris
Doubting Thomas (1935) as Mr. Spindler
I Live My Life (1935) as Max
1,000 Dollars A Minute (1935) as Pete
Rendezvous (1935) as Taxi Driver (uncredited)
Palm Springs (1936) as Oscar
Career Woman (1936) as George Rogers
Join the Marines (1937) as Alfred, the Steward
Maid of Salem (1937) as Miles Corbin – Cow Herder
When Love Is Young (1937) as Orville Kane
The Woman I Love (1937) as Duprez
Varsity Show (1937) as Trout
 Behind the Mike (1937) as Tommy Astor
Of Human Hearts (1938) as Chauncey Ames
Dr. Rhythm (1938) as Luke (Ice-Cream Man)
 Held for Ransom (1938) as RFD Mailman (uncredited)
Professor Beware (1938) as The Groom
Spring Madness (1938) as Buck
St. Louis Blues (1939) as Boatman (uncredited)
East Side of Heaven (1939) as Accordion player (uncredited)
Nick Carter, Master Detective (1939) as Bee-Catcher
The Blue Bird (1940) as Wild Plum
Remember the Night (1940) as Willie
Hit Parade of 1941 (1940) as Soda Clerk
Street of Memories (1940) as Student Barber
Little Men (1940) as Reporter
Cheers for Miss Bishop (1941) as Chris Jensen
Meet John Doe (1941) as Dan
The Great Awakening (1941) as Otto, the bookkeeper
Top Sergeant Mulligan (1941) as Frank Snark
Dumbo (1941) as Mr. Stork (voice)
Look Who's Laughing (1941) as Rusty, Soda Jerk (uncredited)
Don't Get Personal (1942) as Lucky
The Lady Is Willing (1942) as Arthur Miggle (uncredited)
Star Spangled Rhythm (1942) as Sterling - 'Sweater, Sarong & Peekaboo Bang' number
Bambi (1942) as Adult Flower (voice, uncredited)
Iceland (1942) as Sverdrup Svenssen
Here We Go Again (1942) as Tommy, Western Union Messenger (uncredited)
The Three Caballeros (1944) as Prof. Holloway (voice)
 Wildfire (1945) as Alkali Jones
A Walk in the Sun (1945) as McWilliams
Make Mine Music (1946) as Narrator (segment "Peter and the Wolf") (voice)
Death Valley (1946) as Slim
Sioux City Sue (1946) as Nellie Bly
Her Wonderful Lie (1947)
Trail to San Antone (1947) as Droopy Stearns
Twilight on the Rio Grande (1947) as Pokie
Saddle Pals (1947) as Waldo T. Brooks Jr.
Robin Hood of Texas (1947) as Droopy Haynes
Addio Mimí! (1949) as Aristide
The Beautiful Blonde from Bashful Bend (1949) as Basserman Boy
Alice in Wonderland (1951) as Cheshire Cat (voice) 
Kentucky Rifle (1955) as Lon Setter
Shake, Rattle and Rock! (1956) as Albert 'Axe' McAllister
The Adventures of Huckleberry Finn (1960) as Barber
Alakazam the Great (1960) as Narrator (English version, voice)
My Six Loves (1963) as Oliver Dodds (uncredited)
It's a Mad, Mad, Mad, Mad World (1963) as Fire Chief
Batman (1966; deleted scenes)
The Jungle Book (1967) as Kaa, The Snake (voice)
Live a Little, Love a Little (1968) as Milkman
The Aristocats (1970) as Roquefort, The Mouse (voice)
Cries (1975) as Narrator
Super Seal (1976) as Cap'n Zach
Won Ton Ton, the Dog Who Saved Hollywood (1976) as Old Man on Bus
The Many Adventures of Winnie the Pooh (1977) as Winnie the Pooh (voice)
Thunder & Lightning (1977) as Hobe Carpenter

Short subjects

The Battling Kangaroo (1926) as Napoleon French
The Girl from Everywhere (1927) as Assistant Director
The Girl from Nowhere (1928) as Minor Role (uncredited)
One Track Minds (1933) as Train Snack Salesman
Not the Marrying Kind (1933) 
Meeting Mazie (1933) 
Born April First (1934) 
Pleasing Grandpa (1934)
Picnic Perils (1934)
Sterling's Rival Romeo (1934) as Sterling
Father Knows Best (1935) as Bashful Boy
My Girl Sally (1935) 
Bring 'Em Back A Lie (1935)
Double Crossed (1935) 
His Last Fling (1935)
The Pelican & The Snipe (1944) as Narrator (voice, uncredited)
The Cold-Blooded Penguin (1944) as Narrator (voice)
Unusual Occupations L-5-2 (1945) as Himself
Peter & The Wolf (1946) as Narrator (voice)
Moron Than Off (1946) as Elmer Fossdinkle
Mr. Wright Goes Wrong (1946)
Scooper Dooper (1947) as Himself
Hectic Honeymoon (1947) as Eddie Jones
Mickey and the Beanstalk (1947) as Narrator
Speaking of Animals No. Y7-1: Dog Crazy (1947) as Dog Owner
Man or Mouse (1948) as Elmer Dinkle
Flat Feat (1948) as Officer Sterling Smith / Smith's Father
Lambert the Sheepish Lion (1952) as Narrator / Mr. Stork (voice)
Susie the Little Blue Coupe (1952) as Narrator (voice)
The Little House (1952) as Narrator
Ben and Me (1953) as Amos Mouse (voice)
Goliath II (1960) as Narrator (voice)
Winnie the Pooh and the Honey Tree (1966) as Winnie the Pooh (voice)
Winnie the Pooh and the Blustery Day (1968) as Winnie the Pooh (voice)
Man, Monsters & Mysteries (1974) as Nessie (voice)
Winnie the Pooh and Tigger Too (1974) as Winnie the Pooh (voice)
"Winnie the Pooh:The story behind the masterpiece" (2001) (documentary, archive footage)

Television

Adventures of Superman (1953–55) as Prof. Oscar Quinn / Prof. Twiddle
The Life of Riley (1953–56) as Waldo Binny
The Adventures of Ozzie & Harriet (episode "Pancake Mix"; 1953) as Groceryman
Willy (1955) as Harvey Evelyn
Our Mr. Sun (1956) as Chloro Phyll (voice, uncredited)
The Adventures of Rin Tin Tin (3 episodes; 1956–58) as Sorrowful Joe Jackson
Climax! (episode "Night of a Rebel"; 1957) as Tobias
Hemo the Magnificent (1957) as Lab Assistant (uncredited)
Circus Boy (3 episodes; 1957) as Elmer Purdy
Five Fingers (episode "The Temple of the Swinging Doll"; 1959) as Hayden
The Untouchables (episode "The Unhired Assassin"; 1960) as Horace De Vilbill
Peter Gunn (episode "The Best Laid Plans"; 1960) as Felony
The Real McCoys (episode "The Jinx"; 1960) as Orval McCoy
Shirley Temple's Storybook (episode "The Land of Oz"; 1960) as Jack Pumpkinhead
The Brothers Brannagan (episode "Love Me, Love My. Dog"; 1960) as Shopkeeper
Zane Grey Theatre (episode "Blood Red"; 1961) as Luther
Pete and Gladys (episode "The Projectionist"; 1961) as Lester Smith
Miami Undercover (episode "Room 9"; 1961) as Henry
Margie (episode "False Alarm"; 1962) as Bettenhouse
The Andy Griffith Show (episode "The Merchant of Mayberry"; 1962) as Bert
The Lloyd Bridges Show (episode "The Sound of Angels"; 1962) as Blind Man
The Joey Bishop Show (episode "Joey's Lost What-Cha-Ma-Call-It"; 1963) as Mr. Holland
Hazel (episode "The Retiring Milkman"; 1963) as Claude the Milkman 
The Twilight Zone (episode "What's in the Box"; 1964) as TV Repairman
The Restless Sea (1964) as Mr. H2O (voice)
Linus the Lionhearted (1964) as Sugar Bear / Lovable Yours Truly (voice)
Burke's Law (episode "Who Killed Annie Foran?"; 1964) as Fisk
The Baileys of Balboa (1964–65) as Buck Singleton
Please Don't Eat the Daisies (episode "My Son, the Genius"; 1966) as Mr. Corey
F Troop (episode "Wilton the Kid"; 1966) as Sheriff Pat Lawton
That Girl (episode "Phantom of the Horse Opera"; 1966) as Everett Valentine
Family Affair (episode "Fancy Free"; 1967) as Mr. Frack
Gilligan's Island (episode "The Pigeon"; 1967) as Burt
Daktari (episode "Judy and the Jailbirds"; 1967) as Duke
It Takes a Thief (episode "Rock-Bye, Bye, Baby"; 1969) as Elmo
NBC Children's Theatre (episode "All About Me"; 1973) as Colonel Corpuscle (voice)
Love, American Style (segment "Love and the Face Bow"; 1973) as Dr. Edwin Muller
Tony the Pony (1976) as GG, the Wizard
Tukiki and His Search for a Merry Christmas (1979) as Northwind (voice)
Federal Budget Review (1980) as Man in Washington
We Think the World Is Round (1984) as Pegleg Pelican (voice)
Moonlighting (episode "Atomic Shakespeare"; 1986) as Narrator (voice) 
The Book Caterpillar (1992) as the Book Caterpillar (voice) (final credit voice appearance)

Discography
Uncle Remus Stories (Decca, 1947) as Narrator
Peter and the Wolf (RCA Victor, 1949) as Narrator
Alice in Wonderland (RCA Victor, 1951) as the Cheshire Cat
Susie, the Little Blue Coupe (Decca, 1952) as Narrator
The Little House (Decca, 1952) as Narrator
The Sorcerer's Apprentice/Peter and the Wolf (Disneyland, 1958) as Narrator
The Country Cousin (Disneyland, 1959) as Narrator
Goliath II (Disneyland, 1960) as Narrator
The Grasshopper and the Ants (Disneyland, 1960) as Narrator (also writer)
The Stories and Songs of Walt Disney's Three Little Pigs (Disneyland, 1961) as Narrator
The Absent Minded Professor (Disneyland, 1961) as Narrator
The Best Stories of Aesop (Disneyland, 1961) as Narrator
Mother Goose Nursery Rhymes (Disneyland, 1963) as Narrator
Rudyard Kipling's Just So Stories (Disneyland, 1964) as Narrator
Winnie the Pooh and the Honey Tree (Disneyland, 1965) as Winnie the Pooh
A Happy Birthday Party with Winnie the Pooh (Disneyland, 1966) as Winnie the Pooh
Winnie the Pooh and the Blustery Day (Disneyland, 1967) as Winnie the Pooh/Narrator
Winnie the Pooh and the North Pole Expotition (Disneyland, 1968) as Winnie the Pooh/Narrator
Winnie the Pooh and Tigger (Disneyland, 1968) as Winnie the Pooh/Narrator
Winnie the Pooh and the Heffalumps (Disneyland, 1968) as Winnie the Pooh/Narrator
The Aristocats (Disneyland, 1970) as Roquefort
Winnie the Pooh and Tigger Too (Disneyland, 1974) as Winnie the Pooh
Winnie the Pooh for President (Disneyland, 1976) as Winnie the Pooh

References

Sources
 Rothel, David. 1984. Those Great Cowboy Sidekicks. Scarecrow Press, Metuchen, New Jersey;

External links

 
 
 
 Disney Legends
 New Georgia Encyclopedia: Sterling Holloway 
 "A Perfect Day" by Carrie Jacobs-Bond sung by Sterling Holloway: 

1905 births
1992 deaths
20th-century American comedians
20th-century American male actors
20th-century American male singers
20th-century American singers
People from Cedartown, Georgia
Comedians from Georgia (U.S. state)
Male actors from Georgia (U.S. state)
Woodward Academy alumni
American male stage actors
American male film actors
American male musical theatre actors
American male television actors
American male radio actors
American male voice actors
Methodists from Georgia (U.S. state)
Audiobook narrators
Disney people
California Democrats
Georgia (U.S. state) Democrats
Grammy Award winners
RCA Victor artists
United States Army personnel of World War II